The Mergosono massacre was committed by Indonesian revolutionaries against members of the Chinese community of Mergosono in Malang, East Java on 31 July 1947 during the Indonesian National Revolution. Suspected of espionage for the Dutch colonial authorities, 30 Chinese men and women were rounded up, tortured, and burned, before being buried at a former noodle factory. The bodies were exhumed and reburied in a mass grave on 3 August the same year.

The victims
The identities of 24 victims were provided by the local Chinese general association. The other six victims remain unknown.

 Sie Bian Kiet (football player, popularly known as Freddy Sie)
 Sie Bian Ten
 Tan Soen Seng
 Tan Teng San
 unnamed wife of Tan Teng San
 Koo Pan Tjo
 Kwee Giok Tjhoen
 Oen Nam Tjing
 Koo Siam Tjo
 Kwee Keh Tien
 Kwee Lian Sie
 unnamed wife of Kwee Lian Sie
 Nie Swan Hwie
 Nyonya Kwee Swan Hwie
 Tan Ting Siang
 Yap Tian Seng
 Yap Kong Ing
 Tan Thing Lien
 Tan Siang Soen
 Yap Khik Hien
 Yap Tie Wan
 Go Siong Kie
 Lay Tjoen Hien
 Go Yauw Khing

References

Indonesian National Revolution
Conflicts in 1947
1947 in Indonesia
Massacres in 1947
Massacres in Indonesia
Dutch East Indies
Mass murder in 1947
July 1947 events in Asia
History of East Java
1947 murders in Indonesia
Anti-Chinese sentiment in Indonesia